Rhabdophis conspicillatus, the red-bellied keelback, is a keelback snake in the family Colubridae found in Indonesia and Malaysia.

References

Rhabdophis
Snakes of Southeast Asia
Reptiles of Indonesia
Reptiles of Malaysia
Reptiles described in 1872
Taxa named by Albert Günther
Reptiles of Borneo